St. Anselm's School may refer to:

 St. Anselm's Abbey School, Washington, D.C., US
 St. Anselm's Catholic School, Kent, England
 St. Anselm's North City School, Jaipur, India
 St. Anselm's Pink City Sr. Sec. School, Jaipur, Rajasthan, India
 St Anselm's School, Bakewell, Derbyshire, England
 St. Anselm's Senior Secondary School, Ajmer, Rajasthan, India

See also
Saint Anselm's (disambiguation)
Saint Anselm's College (disambiguation)